Articles on heat storage include:

 Energy storage
 Thermal energy storage
 Hot water storage tank
 Seasonal thermal energy storage (STES)
 Storage heater
 Steam accumulator
 Fireless locomotive